The haidamakas, also haidamaky or haidamaks (singular haidamaka, Haidamaky) were Ukrainian  paramilitary outfits composed of commoners (peasants, craftsmen), and impoverished noblemen in the eastern part of the Polish–Lithuanian Commonwealth. It was a reaction to the Commonwealth's actions that were directed to reconstitute its orders on territory of right-bank Ukraine, which was secured following ratification of the Treaty of Perpetual Peace with Muscovy in 1710.

Etymology and terminology

Etymology

The word haydamak has two related meanings: either 'Ukrainian insurgent against the Poles in the 18th century', or 'brigand'. The role played by haydamaks in the anti-Polish Ukrainian revolts of the 18th-century led by Maksym Zalizniak and Ivan Honta led to the first meaning.

The word has been adopted into Ukrainian from the Crimea and the neighbouring region, where it has been used in some Kipchak, Oghuz and Slavic languages. The origin is the Turkic word 'haydamak', 'to drive, to drive away', the etymological vehicle being the Ottoman Turkish. The verb (h)ayda was probably derived from the onomatopoeic stem used to spur someone on: 'hayda!'. Depending on the local context, it was understood to mean 'driving someone or something away', and later 'to chase, to pursue'. In the infinitive Turkish verbs have the ending -mak or -mek. The ending -ak(a) however also exists in Ukrainian, in words with meanings somewhat related to each other, such as huljáka, 'crouser' (crouse = brisk, livelyl, confident), pyjak(a), 'drunkard', rozbyšaka, 'brigand', and that might have led to the initial meaning of 'to chase, to pursue' evolving to mean 'chaser, pursuer', and finally 'insurgent'. In different other languages the meaning of 'brigand' given to hajdamak(a) took shape in accordance to the way their enemies saw the hajdamaks.

In Ottoman Turkish, haydamak used to mean "a cattle-lifter, marauder", and in modern Turkish it means "to attack, raid, drive cattle".

Older Ukrainian terms
Other more ancient exonyms of the same haidamaks include levenetz and deineka. Equivalents of haidamaka include opryshok in Ukrainian Galicia.

In other languages
The Romanian word haidamac means 'strong no-good man'.

The words hajduk used in Central Europe and the Balkans has a similar meaning.

Historical connotations
Because of the massacres of Jews, Jesuits, Uniates, and Polish nobility, the Polish language term Hajdamactwo became a pejorative label for Ukrainians as a whole. However, Ukrainian folklore and literature generally (with some notable exceptions) treat the actions of the haidamaks positively. Haidamaky (1841), an epic poem by Taras Shevchenko, treats its subjects both sympathetically and critically.

History
The haidamak movement consisted mostly of local free Cossacks (not members of any host) and peasantry (kozaky and holota), and rebels. 

Haidamaks waged war mainly against the Polish nobility and collaborationists in right-bank Ukraine, though the movement was not limited to the right bank only, and they participated in Zaporozhian raids on the Cossack szlachta in left-bank Ukraine as well. The latter raids occasionally deteriorated to common robbery and murder, for example in the so-called Matsapura case in the Left Bank in 1734. 

Opposition to the szlachta and to Roman Catholics led to the haidamaka rebellions (haidamachchyna). Three major uprisings took place, in 1734, 1750, and the largest – usually referred to as Koliyivschyna in 1768.

The first uprising came in the war for control of the Polish Kingdom in 1734 after the death of Frederick Augustus II in 1733. Russian troops, brought in to remove King Stanisław I (Leszczyński), were initially seen as liberators from the Poles, and an insurrection developed in Kiev, spreading to Podolia and Volhynia. After Augustus III gained the throne of Poland-Lithuania in 1734, the Russian military suppressed the insurrection. Small raids by haidamakas against Polish nobility continued in the following years under the leadership of Hnat Holy.

In 1750 another uprising occurred as the haidamakas continued to receive popular sympathy. Based in the lands of the Zaporozhian Cossacks, they moved into the south of the Kiev Palatinate, generating a near-complete rebellion by Right-Bank Ukraine. Although they captured a number of towns and areas, they were eventually crushed due to lack of organization.

In 1768, led by Zaporozhian Cossack Maksym Zalizniak and leader of the Uman Cossack paramilitary group Ivan Gonta, the peasants were initially successful in conquering much of the Kiev and Bracław Voivodeships, as well as large chunks of Volhynia and Podolia. In captured territories the nobility, Ukrainian Catholics, Jesuits and above all the Jews, were murdered en masse (see Massacre of Uman), which led to a quick response by the Polish army. By July of the same year the Poles – with Russian military assistance – had suppressed the revolt, though bloody repression against the Cossacks lasted for several years. See Koliyivschyna article for more details.

The last flare-up of the Haydamak violence occurred in 1830s, during the Ustym Karmaliuk rebellion. This final chapter of Haydamaka history was unique in large part due to the support the rebellion enjoyed not only among the peasantry, but also among the Poles and the Jews marginalized and rendered destitute by the Russian Empire.

Cultural depictions of haidamaky 

 Taras Shevchenko published poem Haidamaky (1841).

See also
 Hajduk
 Ustym Karmaliuk (1787–1835), Ukrainian outlaw, the "Ukrainian Robin Hood" or "the last haydamak"
 Khmelnytsky Uprising 1649–1657

References

External links

Articles in the Internet Encyclopedia of Ukraine of the Canadian Institute of Ukrainian Studies:
 Haidamaka
 Haidamaka uprisings
 Koliivshchyna rebellion

18th-century conflicts
18th century in the Polish–Lithuanian Commonwealth
Military history of the Polish–Lithuanian Commonwealth
Polish–Ukrainian wars
Cossack uprisings
18th century in the Zaporozhian Host
Koliivshchyna